In the leadup to the November 2015 general election, various organisations carried out opinion polling to gauge voting intention. Results of such polls are displayed in this article. These polls only include Turkish voters nationwide and do not take into account Turkish expatriates voting abroad.

The results tend to vary widely (see opinion polls in Turkey for further information). Opposition parties tend to regard such polls as unreliable and have presented legislation to Parliament tightening restrictions on how opinion polls conduct their research. After the previous election in June 2015, the polling company ORC issued a written statement apologising for the inaccuracies in their pre-election polls. KONDA, another polling company, made an apology for similar reasons after their predictions varied widely with the actual result after the 2014 presidential election.

Polling accuracy
The following table shows the most accurate polling companies based on the last opinion polls conducted by each company before the June 2015 vote (held on 7 June 2015), taking into account the domestic-only vote shares won in the election.

Controversies
According to media reports, Turkey's Justice and Development Party (AKP) government has attempted to suppress polling companies who publish polls predicting that the AKP will lose seats in the election.

Gezici Research and Polling Company have had some of their pollsters arrested in February and September 2015, after predicting that the AKP will lose power in the next election.

Vote share polling

Graphical summary

Poll results

Seat predictions

See also
Opinion polling for the Turkish general election, June 2015

References

Turkey
2015 2
November 2015 Turkish general election